

United Kingdom forces

Political 
 Elizabeth II, Queen of the United Kingdom from 1952 to 2022
 Margaret Thatcher, Prime Minister of the United Kingdom from 1979 to 1990
 Sir Rex Masterman Hunt, Governors of the Falkland Islands from 1980 until 2 April 1982

Military 
 John Nott, Secretary of State for Defence from 1981 to 1983
 Terence Lewin, Chief of the Defence Staff from 1979 to 1982
 David Evans, Vice-Chief of the Defence Staff from 1981 to 1983
 Henry Leach, First Sea Lord and Chief of the Naval Staff from 1979 to 1982
 John Fieldhouse, Commander-in-Chief Fleet from 1981 to 1982
 Sandy Woodward, Flag Officer First Flotilla from to 1981 to 1983
 Steuart Pringle, Commandant General Royal Marines from 1981 to 1984
 Michael Beetham, Chief of the Air Staff
 Jeremy Moore, Major-general of Royal Marines
 Michael Clapp, commanded amphibious assault group Task Group 317.0
 Julian Thompson, commanded 3 Commando Brigade from 1981 to 1983
 Nick Vaux, commanded 42 Commando from 1981 to 1983
 Tony Wilson, commanded 5th Infantry Brigade
 Jonathan Thomson, commanded Special Boat Service
 Michael Rose, commanded 22 SAS

Argentina

Political 
 Leopoldo Galtieri, President of Argentina from 1981 to 1982
 Oswaldo Jorge García, Military Governor of the Malvinas, South Georgia and South Sandwich Islands (interim)
 Mario Benjamín Menéndez, Military Governor of the Malvinas, South Georgia and South Sandwich Islands

Military 
 Julio Martínez Vivot, Ministry of Defense from 1982 to 1983
 Leopoldo Galtieri, Chief of the General Staff of the Argentine Army from 1981 to 1982
 Leopoldo Suárez del Cerro, Chief of the Joint Chiefs of Staff
 Jorge Anaya, Commander-in-Chief of the Navy
 Basilio Lami Dozo, Commander-in-Chief of the Air Force
 Juan Lombardo, Commander-in-Chief of the South Atlantic Theatre of Operations
 Ernesto Horacio Crespo, commanded South Air Force

 List of leaders
Lists of military commanders